Joseph Kelly Ironstone (June 28, 1898 – December 15, 1972) was a Canadian professional ice hockey player. Ironstone was a goaltender who played professionally from 1921 until 1936. He played two games in the National Hockey League (NHL) with the New York Americans and Toronto Maple Leafs, but played mostly in the minor professional leagues. Ironstone was the second Jew to play in the NHL.

Playing career
Born in Sudbury, Ontario, Ironstone was Jewish.  He first played senior hockey in 1921 with the Sudbury Wolves of the Northern Ontario Hockey Association. He played three seasons with the Wolves before joining the Ottawa Senators for the 1924–25 season. Ironstone was the back-up goaltender for the season, and did not see game action. In 1925–26, Ironstone played for the new New York Americans expansion team of the NHL, but was mostly the backup. He played in one game and allowed 3 goals in 40 minutes, but did not get the decision, becoming the second Jewish player to play in the NHL, after Sam Rothschild; it was his only game of the season. He joined the Niagara Falls Cataracts Canadian Professional Hockey League (Can-Pro) minor league team for the 1926–27 season.

The following season, Ironstone was traded to the Toronto Ravinas, where he was called up to play for the Toronto Maple Leafs of the NHL. He played one game, a 0–0 tie that went to 10 minutes of overtime. Ironstone asked for double the contract rate for the game, an offer which was accepted by the Leafs' owner Conn Smythe. However, Smythe informed Ironstone that would be the last game he would ever play in the NHL, which ultimately was the case.

He returned to the Can-Pro league in 1928–29, and played for numerous teams until 1931, when he retired from hockey temporarily. He returned to hockey when he moved back to Sudbury in 1933, playing for the Sudbury Legionnaires, Falconbridge Falcons, and finally, the Sudbury Wolves, returning to the team he started professionally with.

Personal life
After leaving ice hockey, Ironstone returned to the family business, a men's wear store started by his father Hyman. He was an avid curler and an original member of the Sudbury Granite Club. He died on December 12, 1972, in Sudbury at the age of 74.

In media
Ironstone was the subject of a radio play written by Paul Davies in 1996.

Career statistics

Regular season and playoffs

See also
List of select Jewish ice hockey players

References

External links

1898 births
1972 deaths
Canadian ice hockey goaltenders
Ice hockey people from Ontario
Guelph Maple Leafs (ice hockey) players
Jewish Canadian sportspeople
Jewish ice hockey players
Kitchener Flying Dutchmen players
London Panthers players
New York Americans players
Niagara Falls Cataracts players
Sportspeople from Greater Sudbury
Syracuse Stars (IHL) players
Toronto Maple Leafs players
Toronto Ravinas players